Buccaneer Field is a 4,000-seat multi-purpose stadium in North Charleston, South Carolina. It is home to the Charleston Southern University Buccaneers football team.  The facility opened in 1970, and has been the school's football stadium since 1991, when the program began.

See also
 List of NCAA Division I FCS football stadiums

References

External links
CSU Sports

Sports venues completed in 1970
College football venues
Sports venues in Charleston, South Carolina
Multi-purpose stadiums in the United States
Charleston Southern Buccaneers football